Bruce Lee: A Warrior's Journey is a 2000 documentary on the martial artist Bruce Lee and Jeet Kune Do. The documentary includes never-before-seen behind-the-scenes footage of Bruce Lee's life, as well as parts of the original footage of his incomplete film Game of Death, which had been left out of the film.

Plot
The film has five parts, the first three of which present an overview of Bruce Lee's life, including interviews of his widow, Linda Lee Cadwell, Lee's best student Taky Kimura, Hapkido Grandmaster Ji Han Jae and Kareem Abdul-Jabbar, who co-stars in "Game of Death". The last two parts include 23 minutes of the original footage of "Game of Death".

Cast 
 Bruce Lee (Posthumous appearance, used with archive footage)
 Kareem Abdul-Jabbar
 Dan Inosanto
 Ji Han Jae
 John Little 
 Linda Lee Cadwell
 Taky Kimura
 Ted Hanulak

Production
Five years after Bruce Lee's death in 1973, Golden Harvest used about 11 minutes of Lee's uncompleted original footage intended by him to become the film "Game of Death", completing the rest of their 1978 film using Lee look-a-likes. Twenty-three more minutes of Lee's original footage were considered lost for 28 years, until they were discovered by Bey Logan in 1999. John Little assembled these parts according to Lee's script notes, reflecting more accurately Lee's intentions.

Release
The documentary was released on VHS and DVD by Warner Home Video. It was also released as a bonus feature on the 2004 edition of Enter the Dragon on DVD. It was released with Lee's original English and Cantonese dubbing as part of the documentary.

Legacy
The dialogue of the song Be Like Water has been sampled into various Hip hop and Electronic Dance tracks and has been mentioned in academic works.

The Story 
Bruce Lee's enacted storyline for The Game of Death, directed in Korea by John Little, distributed with the documentary in DVD as special features.

References

External links
 
 The Story on IMDb
 John R. Little's book Bruce Lee: A Warrior's Journey
 Film review at martialartsactionmovies.com
 Detailed plot synopsis review by David Fletcher at allreaders.com
 Bruce Lee: A Warrior’s Journey DVD Review at frontrowreviews.co.uk
Re-Enter the Dragon: a Bruce Lee retrospective at Asia Times
(Wayback Machine copy)

Films about Bruce Lee
Documentary films about actors
2000 films
American martial arts films
2000s Cantonese-language films
Game of Death
Hong Kong martial arts films
2000 martial arts films
2000s American films
2000s Hong Kong films
1970s Hong Kong films